Steve Cardiff (August 10, 1957 – July 6, 2011) was a Canadian politician. He represented the electoral district of Mount Lorne in the Yukon Legislative Assembly.

Political career

He was first elected to the Yukon legislature in the 2002 general election and re-elected in 2006. He won convincingly both times.

He was the NDP caucus critic for the Department of Community Services, the Department of Education, the Department of Highways and Public Works, the Department of Justice, the Yukon Workers' Compensation Health and Safety Board, the Yukon Housing Corporation and the Yukon Liquor Corporation. Cardiff shared critic responsibilities for the Department of Economic Development with party leader Todd Hardy, and was the Third Party House Leader.

Prior to becoming Mount Lorne's MLA Cardiff worked as a certified sheet metal journeyman on industrial, commercial and residential projects in every Yukon community.

For 16 of his 20 years in the sheet metal trade, he volunteered as the local president of the United Association of Plumbers and Pipefitters. He volunteered on the executive of the Yukon Federation of Labour for two years at the same time. He also served on Yukon College's board of governors, which he did for nine years, acting as chair for his final three. He is an active volunteer with the Mount Lorne Community Association.

In February 2009, Cardiff declared his candidacy for the leadership of the New Democrats, following Hardy's resignation as party leader. However, he withdrew from the race later in the year for unspecified personal reasons.

Cardiff was killed in a two-vehicle road accident, one kilometre north of Lewes Lake on the South Klondike Highway, involving a tractor trailer and a small vehicle.

Electoral record

2006 general election 

|-
 
| NDP
| Steve Cardiff
| align="right"|361
| align="right"|43.6%
| align="right"| +3.9%

 
| Liberal
| Colleen Wirth
| align="right"|231
| align="right"|27.9%
| align="right"| -0.2%

|-
! align=left colspan=3|Total
! align=right|828
! align=right|100.0%
! align=right| – 
|}

2002 general election 

|-
 
| NDP
| Steve Cardiff
| align="right"|334
| align="right"|39.7%
| align="right"| +6.0%

 
| Liberal
| Cynthia Tucker
| align="right"|236
| align="right"|28.1%
| align="right"| -16.9%

|-
! align=left colspan=3|Total
! align=right|841
! align=right|100.0%
! align=right| – 
|}

References

External links
 Steve Cardiff

Yukon New Democratic Party MLAs
1957 births
2011 deaths
Road incident deaths in Canada
People from Port Alberni
Accidental deaths in Yukon
21st-century Canadian politicians